Totoral Wind Farm is a 46 MW wind farm in Chile. The wind farm consist of 23 Vestas V90-2MW ( tower) wind turbines and is expected to deliver 100–110 GWh per year. The construction cost was 140 million US$ and revenue is expected to be about 1/10 of construction costs, but is uncertain as production and power prices is variable and it is still uncertain whether the project will be CDM-approved.

The president of Chile Michelle Bachelet and the Norwegian state secretary Sigrid Hjørnegård from the Norwegian Ministry of Petroleum and Energy opened the wind farm. At the time of opening it was the largest wind farm in Chile.

References 

Wind farms in Chile
Energy infrastructure in Coquimbo Region